"Empty Threat" is a song on the album Every Open Eye by Chvrches.

Empty Threat may also refer to:

 "Empty Threat", song on 2012 album Voyageur (Kathleen Edwards album)
 "An Empty Threat", poem by Robert Frost in New Hampshire (collection)
 "The Empty Threat Matter", episode of the radio drama Yours Truly, Johnny Dollar
 "An × Empty × Threat", episode of the anime television series Hunter × Hunter